The women's 10 km competition of the open water swimming events at the 2013 World Aquatics Championships was held on July 23.

Results
The race was started at 12:00.

References

Open water swimming at the 2013 World Aquatics Championships
World Aquatics Championships
2013 in women's swimming